Víctor Casco de Mendoza (1560-1600s) was a Spanish nobleman. He held political posts during the Viceroyalty of Peru, serving as alcalde, regidor and lieutenant governor of Buenos Aires and Asuncion.

Biography 

He was born in Asuncion, the son of Gonzalo Casco, a Spanish conquistador, born in Asturias, and María de Mendoza Irala, belonging to a noble family of Asuncion. He was married to Luisa de Valderrama, daughter of Juan de Fustes and Beatriz Ramírez. 
 
Víctor Casco de Mendoza was one of the sixty-three neighbors who accompanied Juan de Garay in the second foundation of Buenos Aires.

References 

1560 births
1600s deaths
Spanish colonial governors and administrators
Explorers of Argentina
People from Buenos Aires
Mayors of Buenos Aires